Ján Franek (born April 14, 1960, Žilina) is a retired boxer, who represented Czechoslovakia at the 1980 Summer Olympics in Moscow, Soviet Union. There he won the bronze medal in the light middleweight division (– 71 kg), after being defeated in the semifinals by eventual gold medalist Armando Martínez. He is the father of 2009 Miss Slovakia Barbora Franekоvá. He was homeless after being in jail for 14 months. Then he went through couple of rehabs and now he's living in Žilina city. He played the character Franek in the 2015 film Goat.

Olympic results
Defeated Benedetto Gravina (Italy) KO 2
Defeated Zhelio Stefanov (Bulgaria) DQ 3
Defeated Wilson Kaoma (Zambia) KO 2
Lost to Armando Martínez (Cuba) RSC 2

References
 profile
  (Czech)

1960 births
Living people
Sportspeople from Žilina
Czechoslovak male boxers
Slovak actors
Light-middleweight boxers
Boxers at the 1980 Summer Olympics
Olympic boxers of Czechoslovakia
Olympic bronze medalists for Czechoslovakia
Olympic medalists in boxing
Medalists at the 1980 Summer Olympics
Slovak male boxers